Twelve or 12 may refer to:
 12 (number)
 December, the twelfth and final month of the year

Years
 12 BC
 AD 12
 1912
 2012

Film
 Twelve (2010 film), based on the 2002 novel
 12 (2007 film), by Russian director and actor Nikita Mikhalkov
 12 (2003 film), by American filmmaker Lawrence Bridges

Literature
 12: The Elements of Great Managing, a 2006 business book by Rodd Wagner and James K. Hartjker
 Twelve (novel), 2002 novel by Nick McDonell
 Twelve, a 2007 novel by Lauren Myracle, part of The Winnie Years
 Twelve (publisher), an imprint of Grand Central Publishing
 Twelve, a 2009 novel by Jasper Kent

Music
 12 (The Notwist album), 1995
 12 (Herbert Grönemeyer album), 2007
 12 (Keller Williams album), 2007
 12 (Fiskales Ad-Hok album), 2009
 12 (ASAP Twelvyy album), 2017
 12 (Sloan album), 2018
 12 (American Song Book), Mina album, 2012
 12 (Ryuichi Sakamoto album), 2023
 12!, Sonny Stitt album, 1972
 Twelve (Cobalt 60 album), 1998
 Twelve (Patti Smith album), 2007
 Twelve (Iz*One album), 2020
 "12", a song by Insane Clown Posse from the album Riddle Box
 "12", a song by The 1975 from the album The 1975

Other uses
 Twelve (company), a chemical technology company in Berkeley, California
 Twelve (Street Fighter), a video game character from the Street Fighter series
 iOS 12, an operating system by Apple

See also
 Magnesium (atomic number), a chemical element
 The Twelve (disambiguation)
 XII (disambiguation)
 One-two (disambiguation)
 Onetwo (disambiguation)
 12 rating (disambiguation) or 12+
List of highways numbered 12